Codex Marshall Or. 5, is a Bohairic-Greek, uncial manuscript of the New Testament, on a paper. Palaeographically it has been assigned to the 14th century.

Description 

It contains the text of the four Gospels on 265 paper leaves (24.7 by 17.5). The text is written in 1 column per page, 27 lines per page. The titles and initials are illuminated.

The manuscript contains the additions in Luke 22:43.44 (the agony); 23:17.34; John 5:3.4 (the descent of the angel); Pericope Adulterae (7:53-8:11), but omits Matthew 18:11.

In the catalogue the date of a donation is given as Mart 1498 A.D. The manuscript was examined by Lightfoot and Headlam. Horner used it in his edition of the Bohairic New Testament.

Currently it is housed at the Bodleian Library (Marshall Or. 5) in Oxford.

See also 

 Coptic versions of the Bible
 Biblical manuscript
 Huntington MS 17
 Huntington MS 20
 Codex Marshall Or. 6

References 

Coptic New Testament manuscripts
14th-century biblical manuscripts
Bodleian Library collection